Microdiprion is a genus of sawflies belonging to the family Diprionidae.

The species of this genus are found in Europe.

Species:
 Microdiprion fuscipennis (Forsius, 1911)
  Microdiprion pallipes (Fallén, 1808)

References

Diprionidae
Sawfly genera